This is a list of episodes from the Turkish TV series, Kuruluş: Osman. Kuruluş: Osman is the sequel to Diriliş: Ertuğrul, it premiered in Turkey on 20 November 2019 and is ongoing as of 2020. The show has also been a great success in Albania, where it is the "most watched TV show" in the country. In Albania, the show is called "Osmani". The show has also been gaining popularity in Pakistan and India as well.

Series overview

Episodes

Season 1 (2019–2020)

10 or 15 years after the Berke-Hulagu war, Ertuğrul Gazi goes to Konya and he leaves his brother, Dündar Bey, in charge of his tribe. Dündar Bey is easily swain by others into doing their misdeeds, he falls into the trap of the devious Selçuk Sançak Bey, Alişar, and the merciless princess of Kulucahisar, Sofia, who seeks to kill all the Turks. Osman, Dündar's nephew, can see through Alişar and Sofia's plans and warns him about them, despite his refusal to listen. As they continue to build more tension against the Kayı, Geyhatu sends Komutan Balgay to cause more trouble and stop the Kayı, especially Osman, from rebelling against the Mongols. Dündar, who bows down to the Mongols becoming the Sançak Bey, can't see Alişar's anger over his position being given over to him and he believes him when Alişar blames Osman for his son's killing. Soon after, along with the threat from Kulucahisar, Dündar is shown the truth, Alişar is beheaded by Osman, and Osman has married his love, Bala. Following this, after many difficulties, Balgay is presumably killed by Osman while Kulucahisar is conquered by the Kayı with Sofia's death happening in the process.

Season 2 (2020—2021)

Aya Nikola is sent to become the new Tekfur of İnegöl followed by Ertuğrul's return in the tribe. Meanwhile, Yavlak Arslan, the new Uç Bey, seeks to create his own state and sees Osman as an obstacle, later on they unite against the new threat created by the new Han of the İlhanlı, who allies with Nikola against the Turks of Anatolia. Bala also faces the arrival of Targun, Nikola's spy who allies with Osman to save her father, İnal Bey. Along with these problems, Osman is elected as the new Bey after his father's death, whilst he decides to marry a second wife according to his father’s will. Following the arrival of Ömer Bey, father of Malhun Hatun, Geyhatu sends Kara Şaman Togay to eliminate both Osman's Kayı and Ömer's Bayındır. Meanwhile, Malhun is sent by her father to İnegöl to ally with Nikola against Togay but she gets captured in the castle by Togay, who has already allied with Nikola. Osman also captures Nikola's ally Tekfur Aris, seeking to ally with him, Togay then delivers an ultimatum to surrender the Tekfur in exchange for Malhun. Osman decides to use the captured tekfur as bait to trap Nikola. However, Togay kills Aris on the way which gives Nikola an excuse to keep Malhun in captivity. Nikola martyrs Zülfikar Derviş, Osman's spy in İnegöl and also releases Malhun to gain the support of Ömer Bey, who seeks to sell him horses in order to infiltrate and conquer the İnegöl castle but the sale of horses angers Osman, who (not knowing their plan) orders them to be seized. Meanwhile, Togay ambushes some of the Kayı on the way back from Boran Alp's unfinished wedding with Gonca Hatun, which results in the martyrdom of Abdurrahman Gazi. Osman later attacks the incoming Kalanoz, who is the younger brother of Kalanoz and was sent after Flatyos’ capture and death, after learning of his arrival indirectly from the Mongols, killing many Byzantine soldiers and Osman also invites all Turkmen tribes to join the attack except the Bayındırlı, angering Ömer Bey. Şeyh Edebali later calls Osman and Ömer Bey to Söğüt to resolve their differences, leading to Ömer Bey handing over Dündar's ring to Osman, exposing Dündar as a traitor. Although Simon, Petrus and Hazal Hatun are exposed and captured first, Osman lures Dündar into a trap then captures him. Dündar then is taken to the tribe and sentenced to death by Osman. Just as he is about to be strangled to death by the alps, he requests to be shot by Osman instead, using the arrow that killed Bayhoca per Savcı's wish and gets eventually executed, whilst Hazal is exiled to the Çobanoğlu tribe. In the battle, Osman had tricked Togay by promising taxes. But when Osman kicks out the messenger sent by Togay, who later kills him, the Mongol Governor, Wali Yargucu, complains to the vassal ruler of Selcuk, Sultan Mesud II, who invites Osman under the pretext of giving him gifts. After an argument, Osman agrees to pay taxes to the Sultan, who promises him future aid. Osman's reception by Mesud II angers Omer  Bey, who decides to make a name for himself. Nikola uses Omer's anger and uses him to attack Togay. However, Nikola betrays Omer and Togay ambushes him. In the meantime, the Mongol forces raid Omer's tribe, which depresses him, causing him to go to Togay for revenge. Gets saved by Osman. In order to improve their relations, Osman marries Omer's daughter, Malhun Hatun. Later, when the Kayis are migrating to Domaniç, Togay attacks them and Bamsi Beyrek gets martyred. Osman later takes revenge by killing Togay in Soğut. In the meantime, Nikola begins preparations for a great war and fights a major battle against Osman, who is aided by Sultan Mesud II. Osman wins, which greatly increases his respect among the other beys in Bithynia.

 List of Diriliş: Ertuğrul episodes
 List of Kuruluş: Osman characters
 List of awards and nominations received by Kuruluş: Osman

Notes

References

Lists of Turkish drama television series episodes
Diriliş: Ertuğrul and Kuruluş: Osman